Heaven and Hell is a turn-based strategy video game developed by German studio MadCat Interactive and published by CDV Software in 2003.

References

External links

2003 video games
God games
Video games about angels
Video games developed in Germany
Windows games
Windows-only games
Multiplayer and single-player video games
CDV Software Entertainment games